The 2009 CFU Club Championship was the 11th edition of the CFU Club Championship, the annual international club football competition in the Caribbean region, held amongst clubs whose football associations are affiliated with the Caribbean Football Union (CFU). The top three teams in the tournament – W Connection, Puerto Rico Islanders, and San Juan Jabloteh – qualified for the 2009–10 CONCACAF Champions League.

Qualified clubs

The following clubs are all entered into the competition.

Notes
 † San Juan Jabloteh are seeded and will enter in Round 2.
 ‡ Puerto Rico Islanders are seeded and will enter in Round 3.
 The following CFU member associations did not enter a club into the tournament: Anguilla, Bahamas, Barbados, Bermuda, British Virgin Islands, Cayman Islands, Cuba, Dominican Republic, French Guiana, Grenada, Guadeloupe, Martinique, Montserrat, Saint Kitts and Nevis, Saint Lucia, Saint Martin, Saint Vincent and the Grenadines, Sint Maarten, Turks and Caicos Islands, and U.S. Virgin Islands.

Competition format

There was no tournament in 2008 because, prior to this edition, the CFU Club Championship had been held near the end of the calendar year, but in 2008 it was decided that it would be held near the beginning of the following calendar year in order to have the competition take place closer to the next CONCACAF Champions League, which uses this tournament as the Caribbean zone qualifying tournament. As a result, this, the next tournament, was held in early 2009.

The draw for the first round was held at the CONCACAF office in New York City on January 15. The first round matches were originally scheduled to be held over two legs on March 18 and 25. The draw for round two was completed immediately following the first round draw. The second round will also be two-legged and will be held in mid-April. The semi-finals, final and third-place match will be single-elimination matches hosted in Trinidad and Tobago. The semi-finals will be played on May 15, and the final and third-place match will be played two days later at the same venue.

Draw

The first round was played among clubs from two pots. Each club was drawn against another club from the opposing pot.

1st round

The first round was contested in five two-legged matchups. Team #1 in each matchup hosted the first leg. The schedule for the first round legs was updated on March 11 due to necessary travel accommodations for clubs and local events occurring in Aruba and Haiti that would conflict with the original match schedule.

|}

First leg

Second leg

W Connection won 17–1 on aggregate.

Inter Moengotapoe won 3–2 on aggregate.

Hoppers won 5–3 on aggregate.

Cavaly won 6–0 on aggregate.

Tempête won 3–1 on aggregate.

2nd round

San Juan Jabloteh were seeded and received a bye to the 2nd round. San Juan Jabloteh and W Connection both hosted their first leg matchups on the same day and decided to host their matches as a billed doubleheader at Manny Ramjohn Stadium in Marabella. In Jabloteh's return leg to Suriname they were without head coach Terry Fenwick, who did not travel with the team because he had not been paid by the club since the end of the 2008 TT Pro League season.

|}

First leg

Second leg

San Juan Jabloteh won 5–2 on aggregate.

W Connection won 4–1 on aggregate.

Tempête won 8–0 on aggregate.

Final round

All of the matches in the final round will be played at Marvin Lee Stadium in Macoya, Trinidad and Tobago. The final round matchups are single elimination; the losers will play one another in a third place matchup to determine the third and final CFU entrant into the CONCACAF Champions League 2009–10. The Puerto Rico Islanders were seeded and received a bye directly into the final round.

Semifinal round

Third place

Final

Goalscorers

Notes

References

External links

 Caribbean Football Union homepage
 CFU Club Champions Cup Fixtures at CFU homepage
 CFU Club Champions Cup Results at CFU homepage
 Official CONCACAF Champions League page
 2010 Champions League Qualifying/Caribbean at official CONCACAF homepage

2009
2009–10 CONCACAF Champions League
1